Colonel Hans Leonard Svedenhielm was a colonel of the Kingdom of Sweden. In 1788, at the Battle of Valkeala, the general led the main attack of the Swedish troops against the Russian forces. 

Svedenhielm (family) in Adelsvapen [In Swedish]
Swedish generals